Mahasadhvi Mallamma is a 2005 Indian Kannada-language biographical film, based on the life of Hemareddy Mallamma, produced by A. Sanjeev Kumar, N. S. Eliwala, N. S. Jayawadagi on N. S. Productions banner and directed by Renuka Sharma. Starring Meena in the titular role alongside Rajendra Prasad, and Saikumar and music composed by Srishaila.

Plot
A couple Nagireddy and Gouamma in Ramapuram village near Srisailam. They are very kind in nature and always helped many poor people. But these couples were very unhappy because they did not have any children. They went to Srisailam Malikarjuna Swamy temple on Sivarathri and worshiped wholeheartedly to fulfill their desire of having a kid. One night, Mallikarjuna Swamy appeared in Nagireddy's dream and said that a devoted daughter would be born to them. He shared this great news with his wife and felt very happy. Later, a girl child was born to them. Nagireddy named his daughter as Mallamma because she was a gift of Lord Mallikarjuna. They brought up that girl with all care and love. From childhood, she devoted herself to Lord Shiva which made her parents happy. When Mallamma grew old enough, her parents decided to do her marriage with a guy named Baramareddy. He was a son of a rich man of Siddhapuram called Hemareddy.

As Mallamma stepped in her in-laws’ house the wealth and glory at their house also started increasing. She continued her charity and helped the poor and needy in her in-laws’ house also. Mallamma's sister-in-law Nagamma was very rude and she was unable to tolerate this good nature of Mallamma. Nagamma complained about Mallamma to her mother and brother. Mallamma's mother-in-law started torturing by asking her to do all hard work. Mallamma was bearing all these and she never stopped worshiping Lord Shiva. They started sending her to herd the cows; there also she continued her Siva pooja. Later they told Baramanna about Mallamma's character and forced him to kill Mallamma. When Baramanna saw her worshiping Mallikarjuna Swamy, who came to her as sage, he dropped his knife. Finally, Mallamma pleased all her family members with her incomparable devotions to Lord Siva and went about the country preaching Shivatathvam and finally reached the presence of Siva.

Cast
Meena as Mallamma
Rajendra Prasad as Barama Reddy
P. Sai Kumar
Sridhar as Shiva
Anantha Velu 
Krishne Gowda 
B. K. Shankar
Tharika
Anuradha Sridhar 
Pramila Joshai 
Anitha Rani 
Srilalitha

Production 
Deccan Herald reported in July 2003 that Mahasadhvi Mallamma was under production. It was the third film made on Mallamma after Hemareddy Mallamma (1946) and another film of the same released in 1973. It was reported that Renuka Sharma was directing the film produced by A. Sanjeev Kumar, N. S. Yeliwala and N. S. Jayawadagi.

Soundtrack

Music composed by Srishaila. Music released on Ashwini Audio Company.

References

Indian biographical drama films
Hindu devotional films
2005 biographical drama films
2005 films
2000s Kannada-language films
Films directed by Renuka Sharma